Nonnie is a given name. Notable people with the name include:

 Nonnie Griffin (1933–2019), Canadian actress
 Nonnie Moore (1922–2009), American fashion editor

See also
 Nonnie & Alex, 1995 short film
 Nonny
 Noni (disambiguation)